The 40th Canadian federal election was held on October 14, 2008.

The Conservative Party of Canada, led by Stephen Harper, won a minority government. The Conservatives won 143 seats. The Liberal Party of Canada, won 77 seats. The separatist Bloc Québécois won 49 seats and the social-democratic New Democratic Party won 37. Two independent candidates won a seat, one each in Nova Scotia and Quebec.

Vote Total

Vote and seat summaries

Gains and losses

The following seats changed allegiance from the 2006 election:

Conservative to Liberal
Avalon
St. John's South—Mount Pearl

Conservative to BQ
Louis-Hébert

Conservative to NDP
Edmonton—Strathcona
St. John's East

Conservative to Independent
Cumberland—Colchester—Musquodoboit Valley

Liberal to Conservative
Brant
Desnethé—Missinippi—Churchill River
Egmont
Fredericton
Huron—Bruce
Kenora
Kitchener Centre
Kitchener—Waterloo
London West
Miramachi
Mississauga—Erindale
Newmarket—Aurora
North Vancouver
Nunavut
Oak Ridges—Markham
Oakville
Richmond
Saint Boniface
Saint John
Thornhill
West Nova
West Vancouver—Sunshine Coast—Sea to Sky Country

Liberal to NDP
Algoma—Manitoulin—Kapuskasing
Churchill
Nickel Belt
Outremont
Sudbury
Thunder Bay—Rainy River
Thunder Bay—Superior North
Vancouver Kingsway
Welland

BQ to Conseervative
Roberval—Lac-Saint-Jean

BQ to Liberal
Brossard—La Prairie
Papineau

NDP to Conservative
Surrey North
Vancouver Island North

NDP to Liberal
Parkdale—High Park

Results by electoral district

Results by province

Atlantic provinces
The Liberals won 17 seats in the Atlantic Provinces, the Conservatives ten, the NDP four, and Independent one. This is a swing of one seat from the Liberals to each of the other parties.

Newfoundland and Labrador
Buoyed by the so-called "ABC Campaign", spearheaded by popular Newfoundland and Labrador Premier Danny Williams, the Liberals won six seats and the NDP one. The Avalon and St. John's South—Mount Pearl seats changed hands from the Tories to the Liberals. The St. John's East seat changed from the Tories to NDP, as Norman Doyle retired. The change in Avalon was a crushing blow as the incumbent Fabian Manning was soundly defeated by the Liberals' Scott Andrews.

Prince Edward Island
The three Liberal incumbents have been re-elected. In the fourth riding, Egmont, incumbent Liberal Joe McGuire retired, and the seat went to the Tories.

Nova Scotia
All incumbents were re-elected, except in Halifax where the retiring Alexa McDonough was replaced by another New Democrat, Megan Leslie, and in West Nova the incumbent Liberal Robert Thibault was defeated by Tory Greg Kerr.  Elizabeth May of the Green Party was defeated in the riding of Central Nova, which was a battle between her and incumbent cabinet minister Peter MacKay.

New Brunswick
The Liberal Green Shift was most unpopular in New Brunswick. Three ridings previously held by the Liberals switched to the Tories; Fredericton, Miramichi, and Saint John. In the other seven ridings the incumbent was re-elected.

Quebec

The Bloc Québécois played obstruction in preventing the Conservatives from achieving a majority. Fifteen battleground ridings were in Quebec, with only three changing hands. The BQ lost the riding of Papineau to the Liberals, but gained the riding of Louis-Hébert from the Tories. A recent recount saw the Liberals take the riding of Brossard—La Prairie from the BQ, slightly strengthening their position.

Ontario

Twenty battleground ridings were in Ontario alone, and the Conservatives took the ridings of Brant, Oakville, Huron—Bruce and Halton from the Liberals, where the NDP took Thunder Bay—Superior North, Thunder Bay—Rainy River, Algoma—Manitoulin—Kapuskasing, Sudbury and Nickel Belt from the Liberals. The Liberals themselves lost 16 seats in Ontario.

Prairie provinces

Manitoba

Saskatchewan

All seats were retained by their incumbent parties.  The closest race was Saskatoon—Rosetown—Biggar.  There, the incumbent Carol Skelton did not seek reelection, giving the NDP high hopes that well-known farmers' activist Nettie Wiebe might re-establish a federal NDP presence in Parliament from the province.  The seat was retained by Conservative Kelly Block in a close two-way race to keep the NDP shut out in Saskatchewan - despite the fact that their proportion of the popular vote there was in fact higher than any other province outside Atlantic Canada.

Alberta

Arguably the Conservatives' power base, Alberta's Tory incumbents were all re-elected except for the riding of Edmonton—Strathcona, which the NDP narrowly took that riding with 442 votes.

British Columbia
The Conservatives regained the seats lost in the 2006 election and held on to seven of the ten battleground ridings.  They took the ridings of West Vancouver—Sunshine Coast—Sea to Sky Country from the Greens and Richmond from the Liberals.

Territories
Liberal candidate in the Yukon and the NDP candidate in Western Arctic (the Northwest Territories) won re-election.

However, in Nunavut the Liberal candidate Kirt Ejesiak was defeated by Conservative Leona Aglukkaq to give the modern Conservatives their first elected member from the territories.

Incumbent MPs defeated

Conservative gains
 Omar Alghabra, incumbent Liberal MP for  Mississauga—Erindale was defeated by Conservative candidate Bob Dechert.
 Catherine Bell, incumbent New Democrat MP for Vancouver Island North was defeated by Conservative candidate John Duncan.
 Bonnie Brown, incumbent Liberal MP for Oakville was defeated by Conservative candidate Terence Young.
 Charles Hubbard, incumbent Liberal MP for Mirmachi was defeated by Conservative candidate Tilly O'Neill-Gordon.
 Susan Kadis, incumbent Liberal MP for Thornhill was defeated by Conservative Candidate  Peter Kent.
 Karen Redman, incumbent Liberal MP for Kitchener Centre was defeated by Conservative candidate Stephen Woodworth.
 Lloyd St. Amand, incumbent Liberal MP for Brant was  defeated by Conservative Candidate Phil McColeman.
 Andrew Telegdi, incumbent Liberal MP for Kitchener—Waterloo was defeated by Conservative candidate Peter Braid by 73 votes.  The automatic recount on October 17, 2008 found that Braid won by only 17 votes.
 Lui Temelkovski, incumbent Liberal MP for Oak Ridges—Markham was defeated by Conservative Candidate Paul Calandra.
 Garth Turner, incumbent Liberal MP for Halton was defeated by Conservative candidate Lisa Raitt.
 Paul Zed, incumbent Liberal MP for Saint John was defeated by Conservative candidate Rodney Weston.
Blair Wilson, incumbent Green MP for West Vancouver—Sunshine Coast—Sea to Sky Country was defeated by Conservative candidate John Weston
Raymond Chan, incumbent Liberal MP for Richmond was defeated by Conservative candidate Alice Wong.

Liberal gains
 Vivian Barbot, incumbent Bloc Québécois MP for Papineau was defeated by Liberal candidate Justin Trudeau.
 Wajid Khan, incumbent Conservative MP for Mississauga—Streetsville was defeated by Liberal candidate Bonnie Crombie
 Marcel Lussier, incumbent Bloc Québécois MP for Brossard—La Prairie was defeated by Liberal candidate Alexandra Mendès.
 Peggy Nash, incumbent New Democrat MP for Parkdale—High Park was defeated by Liberal candidate Gerard Kennedy
 Fabian Manning, incumbent Conservative MP for Avalon was defeated by Liberal candidate Scott Andrews.

NDP gains
 Ken Boshcoff, incumbent Liberal MP for Thunder Bay—Rainy River was defeated by New Democrat candidate John Rafferty.
 Rahim Jaffer, incumbent Conservative MP for Edmonton—Strathcona, was defeated by New Democrat candidate Linda Duncan.
 Tina Keeper, incumbent Liberal MP for Churchill was defeated by New Democrat candidate Niki Ashton.
 Diane Marleau, incumbent Liberal MP for Sudbury was defeated by New Democrat candidate Glenn Thibeault.
 John Maloney, incumbent Liberal MP for Welland was defeated by New Democrat candidate Malcolm Allen.
 Brent St. Denis, incumbent Liberal MP for Algoma—Manitoulin—Kapuskasing was defeated by New Democrat candidate Carol Hughes.

Bloc Québécois gains
 Luc Harvey, incumbent Conservative MP for Louis-Hébert was defeated by Bloc Québécois candidate Pascal-Pierre Paillé
 Louise Thibault, incumbent Independent MP for Rimouski-Neigette—Témiscouata—Les Basques was defeated by Bloc Québécois Claude Guimond

Open seat gains

Conservatives
 Leona Aglukkaq, Conservative candidate defeats Liberal candidate Kirt Ejesiak in Nunavut.  The seat was vacated by incumbent Liberal MP Nancy Karetak-Lindell.
 Keith Ashfield, Conservative candidate defeats Liberal candidate David Innes in Fredericton. The seat was vacated by incumbent Liberal MP Andy Scott.
 Gail Shea, Conservative candidate defeats Liberal candidate Keith Milligan in Egmont. The seat was vacated by incumbent Liberal MP Joe McGuire.

Liberals
Siobhan Coady, Liberal candidate defeats Conservative candidate Merv Wiseman in St. John's South—Mount Pearl. The seat was vacated by incumbent Conservative MP Loyola Hearn.

New Democrats
 Don Davies won the district of Vancouver Kingsway, vacated by Conservative MP David Emerson.
 Claude Gravelle won the district of Nickel Belt, vacated by Liberal MP Raymond Bonin.
 Jack Harris was elected in St. John's East, vacated by Conservative MP Norman Doyle.
 Bruce Hyer won the district of Thunder Bay—Superior North, vacated by Conservative MP Joe Comuzzi.

Defeated cabinet ministers and party leaders

 Michael Fortier (Minister of International Trade) - Defeated in Vaudreuil-Soulanges by Bloc Québécois incumbent Meili Faille
 Elizabeth May (Leader - Green Party of Canada) - Defeated in Central Nova by Conservative incumbent Peter MacKay

Popular vote by province

Voter turnout
Voter turnout was the lowest in Canadian election history, as 59.1% of the electorate cast a ballot. All federally funded parties except for the Greens attracted fewer total votes than in 2006; the Greens received nearly 280,000 more votes this election. The Conservatives lost 167,494 votes, the Liberals 850,000, the Bloc 200,000 and the NDP 70,000.

See also
 Results by riding for the Canadian federal election, 2008
 List of Canadian federal electoral districts

References

External links
 Elections Canada
 History of Federal Ridings since 1867

2008 Canadian federal election